The 1950 LEN European Aquatics Championships were held 20–27 August 1950 in Vienna, Austria.

Medal table

Medal summary

Diving
Men's events

Women's events

Swimming
Men's events

Women's events

Water polo

See also
List of European Championships records in swimming

References

European Championships
European Aquatics Championships
LEN European Aquatics Championships
International aquatics competitions hosted by Austria
European Aquatics
1950s in Vienna
August 1950 sports events in Europe